Frans Sumarta Mendur (16 April 1913 – 24 April 1971) was an Indonesian journalistic photographer whose photos of the Proclamation of Indonesian Independence were the only photos published of the historic event. He also photographed other iconic photos recording the struggle of the young nation.

Mendur was working at the Japan-backed Indonesian newspaper Asia Raya when he heard that the proclamation would be announced by Sukarno at his home at Pegangsaan Timur No. 56. After independence, Mendur worked briefly at the Indonesian newspaper Merdeka. In 1946, he established the Indonesian Press Photo Service (IPPHOS) with Oscar Ganda, Alex Mamusung, Alex Mendur (his brother), Frans Umbas, and Justus Umbas.

Mendur along with his brother, Alex, received the Bintang Jasa Utama on 9 November 2009 for their photo journalistic roles during the beginning of the republic. The following year, they received the Bintang Mahaputera Nararya on 12 November 2010. A monument in honor of them in their hometown of Kawangkoan was dedicated by President Susilo Bambang Yudhoyono on 11 February 2013. Mendur was the fourth of eleven children of August Mendur and Ariantje Mononimbar.

References

Bibliography
 
 
 
 
 
 

Minahasa people
1913 births
1971 deaths
Indonesian photographers
People from Minahasa Regency